WEGS is a Christian radio station licensed to Milton, Florida, broadcasting on 91.7 MHz FM.  The station serves the Pensacola, Florida area and is owned by Florida Public Radio, Inc.

References

External links
WEGS's website

EGS
Moody Radio affiliate stations